Mikhaylo Lomonosov is a 1955 Soviet film directed by Aleksandr Ivanov.

Plot 
The film tells about the great Russian scientist Mikhailo Lomonosov, who, after completing his studies in Germany, returns to Russia, where he dreams of creating scientific centers and opening a university.

Starring 
 Boris Livanov as Mikhaylo Lomonosov
 Asta Vihandi as Elizaveta Lomonosova
 Vladimir Soshalsky as Shuvalov
 Vladimir Belokurov as Prokop Andreevitch
 Sergei Plotnikov as Archbishop
 Yuri Rodionov as Popovsky
 Aleksey Batalov as Muzhik
 Ants Eskola as Rikhman
 Janis Osis as Miller
 Alfred Rebane as Shumakher

References

External links 
 

1955 films
1950s Russian-language films
Soviet biographical films
1950s biographical films